Dactylis glomerata, also known as cock's-foot, orchard grass, or cat grass (due to its popularity for use with domestic cats) is a common species of grass in the genus Dactylis. It is a cool-season perennial C3 bunchgrass native throughout most of Europe, temperate Asia, and northern Africa.

Distribution
Dactylis glomerata occurs from sea level in the north of its range, to as high as 4,000 meters in altitude in the south of its range in Pakistan. It is widely used for hay and forage.

It is a principal species in the widespread National Vegetation Classification habitat community MG1 (Arrhenatherum elatius grassland) in the United Kingdom, and so can be found with Arrhenatherum elatius (false oat grass).

It can be found in meadows, pasture, roadsides, and rough grassland.

It has been introduced into North America, New Zealand and Australia, and is now widely naturalised. In some areas, it has become an invasive species.

Description
It has a characteristic flattened stem base which distinguishes it from many other grasses.

It flowers from June to September.

Taxonomy
Dactylis glomerata is treated as the sole species in the genus Dactylis by some authors, while others include one to four other species. It is commonly divided into several regional subspecies, particularly by those authors accepting only the single species:
Dactylis glomerata subsp. glomerata. Widespread; described from Europe.
Dactylis glomerata subsp. altaica. Central Asia.
Dactylis glomerata subsp. himalayensis. (syn. D. himalayensis). Western Himalaya.
Dactylis glomerata subsp. hispanica (syn. D. hispanica). Mediterranean, SW Asia.
Dactylis glomerata subsp. ibizensis. Balearic Islands.
Dactylis glomerata subsp. judaica
Dactylis glomerata subsp. juncinella. Spain.
Dactylis glomerata subsp. lobata (syn. D. glomerata subsp. aschersoniana, D. aschersoniana, D. polygama). Central Europe.
Dactylis glomerata subsp. lusitanica. Portugal.
Dactylis glomerata subsp. marina (syn. D. marina). Western Mediterranean region, Iberia, Canary Islands.
Dactylis glomerata subsp. reichenbachii. Italy.
Dactylis glomerata subsp. santai
Dactylis glomerata subsp. slovenica. Central Europe.
Dactylis glomerata subsp. smithii (syn. D. smithii). Macaronesia.
Dactylis glomerata subsp. woronowii (syn. D. woronowii). Russia.

Dactylis glomerata subsp. glomerata and subsp. hispanica are tetraploid forms with 28 chromosomes; some of the other subspecies, including subsp. himalayensis and subsp. lobata are diploid, with 2n = 14. Hexaploid forms with 42 chromosomes are also known, but rare. Tetraploid forms are larger and coarser than diploid forms.

Cultivation and uses
Cock's-foot is widely used as a hay grass and for pastures because of its high yields and sugar content, which makes it sweeter than most other temperate grasses. In dry areas as in much of Australia, Mediterranean subspecies such as subsp. hispanica are preferred for their greater drought tolerance. It requires careful grazing management; if it is undergrazed it becomes coarse and unpalatable.

In some areas to which it has been introduced, cock's-foot has become an invasive weed, notably some areas of the eastern United States.

As with other grasses, the pollen can cause allergic rhinitis (hay fever) in some people.

The grass is popularly grown to satisfy the craving of domestic cats to chew grass, hence its colloquial name cat grass.

The seeds were first collected by Rogers Parker in Hertfordshire; this was then developed by the agricultural reformer Coke of Norfolk. Parker's estate, Munden, near Bricket Wood, was inherited by the botanist George Hibbert.

Butterfly foodplant
The caterpillars of many butterfly species feed on cock's foot, including:
 Meadow brown (Maniola jurtina)
 Wall brown (Lasiommata megera)
 Gatekeeper (Pyronia tithonus)
 Large skipper (Ochlodes venata)
 Essex skipper (Thymelicus lineola)
 Small skipper (Thymelicus sylvestris)
 Zabulon skipper (Poanes zabulon)
 Speckled wood (Pararge aegeria)

References

Pooideae
Bunchgrasses of Africa
Bunchgrasses of Asia
Bunchgrasses of Europe
Flora of temperate Asia
Flora of North Africa
Grasses of India
Grasses of Pakistan
Taxa named by Carl Linnaeus
Butterfly food plants
Forages